Yuhuan railway station is a planned railway station in Yuhuan, Taizhou, Zhejiang, China. It will be the southern terminus of the Hangzhou–Taizhou high-speed railway. The station is expected to start construction in March 2022 and open in September 2025 with the Wenling-Yuhuan section of Hangzhou-Taizhou high-speed railway.

References

Railway stations under construction in China
Railway stations in Zhejiang